Shoukatabad (alternative spelling Shaukat Abad) is a Union Council of Mansehra District in Khyber-Pakhtunkhwa province of Pakistan. It is located to the north-west of the district capital Mansehra.

References

Union councils of Mansehra District